Gary L. Sturgess, AM is an academic and former public servant from Sydney, Australia, whose current research is focused on the management of front line public services. He is Adjunct
Professor of Public Service Innovation with the School of Government and International Relations at Griffith University, in Brisbane, Australia.

From 2003 to 2011, he was Executive Director of the Serco Institute, a London-based think tank specialising in the design and management of public service markets. He was previously Cabinet Secretary in New South Wales, Australia, under Premier Nick Greiner, during which time he designed a number of major policy initiatives including Australia's first anti-corruption agency the NSW Independent Commission Against Corruption (ICAC).

From 2011 to 2022, he held the New South Wales Premier’s Chair in Public Service Delivery with the Australia and New Zealand School of Government (ANZSOG), based in Sydney, Australia.

Early years 
Sturgess grew up in Dalby, Queensland, a small town approximately 200 km inland from Brisbane.  He is the second of four sons of Lindsay and Joy Sturgess. He was educated at local state schools, and graduated in law from the University of Queensland.

Career 
He commenced his professional career in Brisbane working as an investment analyst for what was then one of Australia's largest mining companies, MIM Holdings Ltd. In 1980, he moved to Sydney to become the legal correspondent for the Australian news magazine The Bulletin, where he had a legal and civil liberties round.

In 1982, he was recruited by Jim Carlton, recently appointed as Federal Minister for Health, to serve as his private secretary. Following the fall of the Fraser Government in March 1983, he joined the staff of the newly elected Leader of the New South Wales Opposition, Nick Greiner, as the Director of Research and Policy Development. In addition to policy development, he directed extensive research into corruption in the then NSW Government, contributing to a number of public inquiries and criminal prosecutions. His extensive filing database caused the then Leader of the Opposition and later Premier Bob Carr to refer to him as "Lord of the Files".

Upon the change of government in March 1988, he was appointed as Director-General of the NSW Cabinet Office in the Liberal-National Coalition Government led by Premier Nick Greiner, to oversee the implementation of the reform agenda he had developed with Greiner. In the five years he served as Cabinet Secretary, Sturgess personally drove a number of major policy initiatives, including the establishment of Australia's first anti-corruption body, the Independent Commission Against Corruption, the corporatisation of government business enterprises, the so-called "new environmentalism" (including tradeable air, water and fishing permits), and some of the earliest work in Australia on the use of markets for the electricity sector.

From 1990, he was involved in the "new federalism" agenda, initiated by Prime Minister Bob Hawke and Premier Greiner. He led the team of NSW officials at a series of Special Premiers Conferences that produced new policies such as the National Competition Policy, the National Electricity Market, mutual recognition of state regulations, and, ultimately, the formation of the Council of Australian Governments.

He retired from public administration in late 1992, six months after the resignation of Greiner as Premier. From 1993 to 2000, Sturgess chaired a series of government inquiries - into business regulation, the governance of the Great Barrier Reef Marine Park Authority, the financial management of the Australian Federal Police and the rationalisation of Australia's border controls, among other issues.

He also served on a number of public, private and not-for-profit boards, including the Australian Constitutional Centenary Foundation, the NSW Police Board and spent seven years as a non-executive director of the Serco Group PLC, a FTSE-100 public service company operating in Europe, North America and Asia-Pacific.

In 2000, Sturgess relocated to London, where he joined Serco as Adviser to the Board and then from January 2003, as Executive Director of the Serco Institute, whose purpose is "to foster the development of sustainable public service markets through an outward-facing programme of research and communication". In that capacity, he played a leading role in the establishment of the Public Services Strategy Board, the UK's first industry association representing the public service industry, underneath the umbrella of the Confederation of British Industry. He continued to serve as adviser to the Public Services Strategy Board until 2011.

He resigned from the Serco Institute in April 2011 and returned to Australia to take up the New South Wales Premier's ANZSOG Chair in Public Service Delivery at the University of New South Wales, a research position based in the government precinct in Sydney and studying the challenges involved in front-line service delivery. In 2014, he was also appointed as Professor of Public Service Innovation at Griffith University in Brisbane, Australia.

In 2015, he was appointed by the NSW government to chair an inquiry into 'point-to-point transportation', which resulted in the legalisation of ride-sharing and a substantial reconstruction of the regulations governing the taxi industry to enable them to compete.

From 2016 to 2019, he served on the Heritage Council of New South Wales

Research interests 
On taking up the chair with ANZSOG in 2011, Sturgess specialised in studying the relationship between policy/funding and delivery, with a particular focus on the discipline of commissioning. As part of that research agenda, he developed a contestability framework for public services—"benchmarking with consequences"—building on the work of the British health economist Chris Ham. He has been actively involved in the application of these principles in the real world, and in 2015, he was appointed by New South Wales Cabinet to chair a Commissioning and Contestability Advisory Board, advising the NSW Minister for Corrections. In 2016, the NSW government established a Commissioning and Contestability Unit in Treasury, based on his work.

Sturgess has advised a number of government inquiries on commissioning - the Victorian and Queensland Commissions of Audit (2012 and 2013), the National Commission of Audit (2014), the Harper Review of Competition Policy, the New Zealand Productivity Commission's review of social services (2015) and more recently the Australian Productivity Commission's review of human services (2016). He has also advised numerous central and line departments and agencies in Australia, New Zealand, the UK and Canada. He lectured at the UK government's Commissioning Academy from 2013 to 2016, and has taught a three-day Commissioning Academy in Ontario, Canada from 2015 to 2018, and in Ottawa.

In March 2017, Sturgess published a study of public service contracting in the UK, for the Business Services Association, entitled 'Just Another Paperclip?'. He was highly critical of the way in which public service contracting has developed in recent years, and laid the primary responsibility on government, arguing that public service markets are not like commodity markets, but rather are government's supply chain.

Since 2000, he has also undertaken detailed primary research into the contractual system used for transporting convicts to Australia in the early years of European settlement, and has delivered a number of academic papers and published articles in peer-reviewed journals on the operation of this system.

In 2012, he started detailed research to identify the site where the founding Governor of Australia, Arthur Phillip, came ashore in Sydney Cove on 26 January 1788 - based on new documents, maps and drawings that had come to light in the more than 50 years since the question was last considered. The research he undertook with a colleague, Michael Flynn, has generally been accepted. He also led a media campaign, which resulted in the port-a-loo that had been erected on the landing site being removed.

Honours

Sturgess was awarded membership of the Order of Australia in January 2005, for services to government.

In 2022, he was appointed as a Distinguished Fellow with the Australia and New Zealand School of Government.

Personal 

Until 2022 he remained a director of his late father's business, Engine Australia, an Australian after-market diesel engine parts supplier.

He married his wife Helen, an artist, in Brisbane in 1976, and they are the parents of four children and three grandchildren.

References

External links
 Engine Australia

Australian businesspeople
Australian public servants
People from the Darling Downs
Living people
Members of the Order of Australia
1953 births
Academic staff of the University of New South Wales
University of Queensland alumni
21st-century Australian historians